

Android Go products were first showcased at MWC 2018 with six products: Nokia 1, ZTE Tempo Go, Alcatel 1X, General Mobile GM8 Go, Lava Z50, and Micromax Bharat Go. The Blu Vivo Go became the first Android Go device with Android Pie Go edition.

Smartphones 
Smartphones.

Tablet computers
A list of tablet computers.

References 

Android (operating system) devices
Computing comparisons
Google lists
Lists of mobile phones